Bayview is an unincorporated community centered at the intersection of State Route 525 and Bayview Road on Whidbey Island in Island County, Washington, United States.

It is approximately 5 miles (8 km) west of the town of Clinton, and 4 miles (6 km) south of the city of Langley.

Bayview is a crossroads of commerce on the south end of the island, as it is centrally located, compared to the other three communities.  As such, it is home to a hardware store, a craft store, a nursery, a grocery store, an alternative grocery store, and several restaurants. One gas station, a Mobil, sits by the highway.  Bayview is also the home of the South Whidbey Seniors' Center, South Whidbey Fire Rescue, and Whidbey Telecom.

Bayview Corner includes a collection of older buildings renovated in the early part of the 21st Century to house an art gallery, nursery, cafes and specialty shops. A farmers' market operates here during the summer months.

The historic Bayview Community Hall is located just south of Bayview Corner.  Built in 1927 on donated land with volunteer help, the hall is run as a nonprofit organization and is owned by the people living in the South Whidbey School District.

Across Bayview Road from this area is a renovated Sears kit house. This house was originally built in Greenbank, and for approximately 90 years it occupied a prominent corner at Hwy 525 & Wonn Road on the Greenbank Farm, before being displaced by a highway re-alignment project. It was later renovated and moved to Bayview.

The Bayview Alternative School is across Bayview Road from Bayview Corner. The building was formerly used as a K-12 school and a branch of Skagit Valley College.

Just south of the commercial area on Bayview Road is one of Whidbey Island's off-leash dog parks, Marguerite Brons Memorial Off-Leash Park.

Bayview is not to be confused with Bay View, located on the mainland in Skagit County.

References

South Whidbey and Its People. (Volume II), Lorna Cherry, 1985, South Whidbey Historical Society

Unincorporated communities in Island County, Washington
Unincorporated communities in Washington (state)